The 64th Infantry Division of Urmia is an infantry  division of the Ground Forces of Islamic Republic of Iran Army based in Urmia. Over the 2011–2012 period, it may have become an Operations Headquarters, retaining command of its previous three brigades.

It was active during the Imperial Iranian regime during the 1970s, as a brigade. During the Iran–Iraq War it was reported at Piranshahr.

Representatives of the Democratic Party of Iranian Kurdistan (DPIK) in New York told the Immigration and Refugee Board of Canada on 16 October 1996 that the 64th Infantry Division of Urmia (and, the Brigade of Salmas) were involved in human rights violations against Kurdish civilians between 1983 and 1988.

References 

Infantry divisions of Ground Forces of Islamic Republic of Iran Army
Urmia